The 1918 Presbyterian Blue Hose football team represented Presbyterian College as an independent during the 1918 college football season. Led by Gifford Shaw in his first and only season as head coach, Presbyterian compiled a record of 2–0. The team captain was S. H. Fulton.

Schedule

References

Presbyterian
Presbyterian Blue Hose football seasons
College football undefeated seasons
Presbyterian Blue Hose football